Mohill (meaning "Soft Ground") is a town in County Leitrim, Ireland. The town of Carrick-on-Shannon is approximately 16 km (10 miles) away.

History
The Justinian plague of Mohill devastated the local population in the 6th century. Mohill, or Maothail Manachain, is named for St. Manachan, who founded the Monastery of Mohill-Manchan here  AD. Some sources and folklore say the shrine of Manchan was kept at the Monastery of Mohill-Manchan, before being moved to Lemanaghan in county Offaly for some unrecorded reason. The Monastery was taken over by Augustinians in the 13th century and was later closed in the 16th century, after the time of King Henry VIII. The site of the church is now occupied by a Church of Ireland church and graveyard.

Ownership of the town passed to the Crofton family during the plantations and areas around the town were owned by the Clements family (Lord Leitrim), who built the nearby Lough Rynn estate and was also the owner of what is now Áras an Uachtaráin (Viceregal Lodge, Dublin). The population falling within the union at the 1831 census had been 66,858. The new workhouse, built in 1840–42, occupied a  site and was designed to accommodate 700 inmates. During the great famine, Anthony Trollope wrote a voyeuristic narrative on Mohill in his novel The Macdermots of Ballycloran, an early work.

Hyde Street is named after Rev Arthur Hyde, grandfather of Douglas Hyde, first President of Ireland, who spent part of his childhood in the town. Through at least the 19th and 20th centuries, an impressive number of annual fairs were held at Mohill on: 14 January, February 4, February 25 (Monaghan Day), 8 April, 8 May (or 10 May), 3 June, 1 July, 31 July (or 2 August),  19, 9 and 30 August September, 19 October, 11 November, and 2 December. Back in 1925, Mohill town had population of 755 people, and contained 29 houses licensed to sell alcohol.#

Religion
The Roman Catholic parish of Mohill also includes the nearby church areas of Eslin and Gorvagh and is administered from St Patrick's Church at the top of the town. The Church of Ireland is located at the bottom (east) of the town where the Augustinian Monastery once stood.

Transport
The town was served by the narrow-gauge Cavan and Leitrim Railway, which closed in 1959. Mohill railway station opened on 24 October 1887 and finally closed on 1 April 1959.

The R201 regional road runs through the centre of the town, as does the R202. The nearest station is Dromod railway station on the Dublin–Sligo railway line. Mohill is served four times daily Monday to Saturday by the Locallink Ballinamore to Carrick on Shannon bus service which also gives two daily connections to Dromod.

Events
The town hosts a large Agricultural Show and Summer festival in August.  On the last Sunday in August.

Sport

The parish of Mohill currently has two Gaelic Football Clubs, Mohill who play in Division One and Eslin a Division Two team. The Mohill Club also fields teams in Divisions 3 and 5, whilst Eslin field their second team in Division 5 also.  Both Clubs have won Senior Titles in the past and in fact, Mohill Faugh-an-Bealaghs won the first-ever Leitrim Championship in 1890, defeating Ballinamore in the final. Ironically Eslin won their first title the following year by defeating Mohill in the Final. Eslin won the last of their three titles in 1917 but have won several Junior Championships in the meantime. Mohill won the last of their five Senior Titles in 2006 defeating St. Marys by one point in a game which saw them complete a dramatic comeback. Mohill and Eslin have often amalgamated for underage competition under the name St. Manachans, named after the patron saint of the parish.

One of Leitrim and Ireland's greatest footballers, Packy McGarty, was born in Mohill. McGarty had the distinction of playing for his county over four decades from 1949 to 1973, but his finest hour was in the 1958 Connacht Final, despite the heartbreaking defeat to Galway. There was in fact at one time three Senior teams in the parish as Gorvagh also had a club. In fact, Gorvagh were the kingpins of Leitrim football in the 1920s and are the only team in the county to win four titles in a row between 1924 and 1928, when they were led by their inspirational captain Jack Bohan. The top scorer on the Leitrim team in the late 1950s and throughout the 1960s was Cathal Flynn who was born in Gorvagh and formed a lethal partnership with McGarty during this period.

Mohill also had a successful soccer team, Mohill Town FC and a Hurling club, St. Finbarrs but sadly both are now defunct. Some Mohill players do however still line out with the neighbouring Gortlettragh Hurling Club. Mohill also has a well known Basketball Club and in 2008 the Mohill Under 16 Girls basketball team won the National Title in the Community Games competition. Mohill is also home to the South Leitrim Harriers who hunt throughout the winter in the surrounding countryside. Mohill also had a very successful athletic club which its participants won multiple races all over the country.

Culture
In 1856 Slater's Directory described Mohill as a prosperous, thriving market town: "(Main Street) contains several good shops well-stocked with the various articles of fashion and of local requisites.  Great progress is manifest in its general appearance and of its size is considered one of the most stirring, and is certainly the most thriving town of any in the surrounding counties".

Education
Primary school(s): St. Manchan's National School (an amalgamation of St. Joseph's Girls National School and St. Michael's Boys National School, opened in 2005) and the Hunt National School.

Secondary school(s): Mohill Community College— an amalgamation of Marian College and Mohill Vocational School, opened in 2008.

Services
Mohill Fire Station has nine retained personnel, with one Scania Class B appliance and one Dennis Class B Appliance. Mohill responds to on average 70 calls per year with 10% RTC's.

People
Mohill is closely associated with Turlough Carolan, the blind harpist, who lived in the town after his marriage. Douglas Hyde, the first president of Ireland, whose family originated from the town, also spent some of his childhood there. Thomas Moran from Drumrahill, near the town, was a renowned 20th-century ballad singer whose songs were collected by the BBC. Matthew Sadlier, a 20-year-old from Mohill, was among 1500 passengers of the RMS Titanic who did not survive the sinking in 1912.

The cleric Charles Reynolds, born and reared at Saint Mary's Priory of Mohill, was a leading figure in the 1535 Irish clerical revolt against Henry VIII. Reynolds was attainted of treason in 1536, for persuading the Pope to excommunicate Henry VIII of England.

 Turlough Carolan, harpist
 Frances Emilia Crofton, artist and past resident of Lakefield  (now a ruin near Mohill)
 William Henry Drummond, poet
 Douglas Hyde, Irish president
 Katherine Lynch, comedian
 James McCombs, New Zealand parliamentarian
 Thomas Moran, singer
 Peter Murphy, Australian businessman
 Charles Reynolds, cleric and revolutionary

Townlands
 Breandrum
 Eslinbridge
 Gorvagh
 Mohill
 Shannagh
 Treanmore

See also
 List of towns and villages in Ireland

References

Secondary sources

External links

Mohill Parish
Mohill history

Mohill
Towns and villages in County Leitrim
Places of Conmaicne Maigh Rein